Bureya may refer to:
Bureya (river), a tributary of the Amur in Amur Oblast and Khabarovsk Krai, Russia
Bureya, Russia, an urban-type settlement in Amur Oblast, Russia